Gilbert Howe (6 August 1891 – 10 January 1917) was a New Zealand cricketer who played five matches of first-class cricket for Wellington in the 1913-14 season. He died in World War I.

Howe was a wicketkeeper and a useful lower-order batsman. He worked as a clerk in the Wellington City Council rates office. He enlisted at the outbreak of World War I, and served as a sergeant in the New Zealand forces that took Samoa in 1914. Later in New Zealand he was commissioned, and he served on the Western Front as a lieutenant. He was killed in action at Messines on 10 January 1917.

After his death his family donated a trophy in his name that was awarded annually until World War II to the most improved player in Wellington cricket.

References

External links
 
 Gilbert Howe at CricketArchive

1891 births
1917 deaths
New Zealand cricketers
Wellington cricketers
New Zealand military personnel killed in World War I
Cricketers from Wellington City
New Zealand Military Forces personnel of World War I
New Zealand Army officers